Heinrich Botho Scheube (August 18, 1853 – 4 March 1923) was a German physician born in Zeitz.

In 1876 he earned his doctorate from the University of Leipzig, and following graduation remained in Leipzig as an assistant in Carl Wunderlich's clinic for internal medicine. From 1877 to 1881 he taught classes at the medical school in Kyoto and was director at a government hospital. Prior to his return to Germany, he visited China, Siam, Java and Ceylon. In 1885 he received his habilitation at Leipzig, and subsequently practiced medicine in Greiz, a town in eastern Thuringia.

Scheube is largely known for his investigations of beriberi. He also studied diseases prevalent in the tropics, and contributed a number of articles in the field of tropical medicine to Eulenburg's Realencyklopädia. While in Japan he conducted research of Ainu culture and customs.

Selected publications 
 Die Ainos (The Ainu), 1881 
 Klinische Propädeutik (Clinical propaedeutics), 1884
 Weitere Beiträge zur pathologischen Anatomie und Histologie der Beriberi (Additional contributions to the pathological anatomy and histology of beriberi), 1884 
 Klinische Beobachtungen über die Krankheiten Japans (Clinical observations on diseases of Japan) in Virchows Archiv, 1885
 Die Beriberi-Krankheit (The berberi disease), 1894 
 Die Krankheiten der warmen Länder (Diseases of tropical countries), 1896

Research 
 Pagel Biographical Dictionary (translated from German)
 Early European Writings on Ainu Culture by Kirsten Refsing

1923 deaths
1853 births
People from Zeitz
People from the Province of Saxony
German tropical physicians
Anthropologists of the Ainu